Jung Young-bae is a South Korean film director. Jung, a former television producer, debuted with the family drama Cherry Tomato (2008). That same year, he released his second film Santamaria (2008), a comedy which starred Jung Woong-in and Sung Ji-ru. His third film, an erotic drama A Pharisee (2014), won Best New Actress (for Viki, a former member of Dal Shabet) and Best New Cinematographer at the 34th Golden Cinema Festival in 2014.

His latest film Confession (2015) is a mystery film about a man who lost his memory after an accident and becomes obsessed to uncover the truth about his past when he finds out his wife is having an affair.

Filmography 
Cherry Tomato (2008) - director, script editor
Santamaria (2008) - director, script editor
A Pharisee (2014) - director, script editor
Confession (2015) - director

References

External links 
 
 
 

Year of birth missing (living people)
Living people
South Korean film directors